Zaidee Jackson (December 30, 1897 – December 15, 1970) was an American-born jazz, spiritual and pop music singer, dancer and actress who performed in the United States and Europe. From 1938 to 1956 she lived and worked in Romania; she was able to return to the United States following an appeal filed by the American Civil Liberties Union with Immigration.

Early life

Zaidee Jackson was born in Augusta, Georgia in the winter of 1897 to C.J. and Alice Jackson, who were both sharecroppers in Berrien County, Georgia.

Sometime after moving to Europe, she began using 1900 as her birth year.

Zaidee had three older siblings, Ora Lee, Era and Sol Jackson. Sometime in late 1900, Alice left her husband and children, taking only Zaidee, and moved north to Boston, Massachusetts, where she met and married Fred Williams. Zaidee took her stepfather's last name. In 1902, Alice and Fred had a baby, Corinna.

On July 6, 1920, Zaidee married James Jackson, but the marriage was unhappy and brief, and on December 6, 1922, James left his wife and moved to Harlem. Around this time, Zaidee met pianist Lawrence Brown, who had been working as an elevator operator and studying in Boston, and who was soon touring Europe with Roland Hayes.

Career

Early career (1924–1927)

From late 1924 to early 1925, Zaidee Jackson travelled across the South as actress with the Andrew Bishop Players, an extension of the old Lafayette Players Company. The company toured Tennessee and Kentucky performing the play Paid In Full.

By mid-1925 Jackson had become the lead performer of Walter Sweatman's Creole Revue, touring the Eastern Seaboard and Canada.

In January 1926, director David Belasco cast Jackson in a melodramatic play staged on Broadway, Lulu Belle. The cast consisted of 100 Black and 15 White performers, the stars being Black actresses such as Evelyn Preer, Ollie Burgoyne, Mattie Wilkes and Fannie Belle de Knight. Jackson had a minor role in the beginning of the play as a Harlem entertainer in the fictional Elite Grotto nightclub. Opening February 9, 1926 at the Belasco Theatre, the show was performed 461 times before closing on May 16. Jackson was also performing at Harlem's Club Alabam, known for its semi-nude Josephine Bakeresque revues.

Between August and November 1926, Jackson recorded six Blues records accompanied by James P. Johnson, Otto Harwick and Duke Ellington. Only four recordings were released.

In late November, Jackson and several of the cast from Lulu Belle were hired by the Black film director Oscar Micheaux, to appear in a film, The Spider's Web. Filming began that winter in Baltimore, and the film was released on January 6, 1927.

In February 1927, Jackson ran into her estranged husband in Harlem and filed for divorce.

In April, she appeared in Desires of 1927 at the Lafayette Theatre. The revue was staged and produced by Irvin C. Miller with Adelaide Hall as its star.

In July, Jackson was cast as Magnolia in Miller & Lyle's Rang Tang, which opened July 12 for 112 performances at the Majestic Theatre. The two-act musical comedy was set in Madagascar and Harlem and featured Flournoy Miller, Aubrey Lyles, Daniel L. Haynes and Josephine Hall.

After its Broadway run closed on October 22, the show prepared to go on the road. However, Lawrence Benjamin Brown, who was touring Europe with Paul Robeson, suggested that Jackson visit him in Paris. In November 1927, Jackson sailed from New York to France.

French and British career (1928–1933)

During January and February 1928, Jackson was in Cannes, performing at the KitKat cabaret. Her performances sparked the interest of members of the British elite such as Elsa Maxwell, the Duke of Kent, and especially Almina Herbert, Countess of Carnarvon, who purchased Jackson's plane ticket to London in May.

In June 1928 Jackson was the star of Playtime at the Piccadilly at London's Piccadilly Hotel. This annual revue was a success. She also performed on BBC Radio every afternoon, and doubled at the Uncles Club.

On August 28, 1928, Jackson recorded two Blues numbers with HMV Records accompanied by pianist Carroll Gibbons, which were never released. In September she twice recorded the American folk song, Waterboy, with British Duophone. Both recordings were rejected.

In October 4, Jackson was hired by director Albin Limpus to perform spirituals and folk songs accompanied by Winifred Smith's Orchestra every afternoon before the curtains raised on May Eginston's latest play, Deadlock, at the Comedy Theatre. The play ran for 17 days before closing. In between singing daily at the Comedy and nightly at the Piccadilly, she recorded four songs for British Duophone, which were successful.

In November, once her contract with the Piccadilly ended, Jackson returned to Paris to perform for a week at the Plantation Cabaret with Eddie South's Orchestra. While in Paris, she saw Afro-British pianist Reginald Foresythe performing and recruited him as her pianist. On November 12, Jackson and Foresythe flew back to London on Imperial Air Lines for a week's engagement at the Café Anglais. During this engagement she recorded four more songs for British Parlophone. Foresythe left to tour Australia with Harlem musical theatre tenor Walter Richardson. At the end of the month, Jackson returned to Paris alone, performing at the Lido des Champs-Elysées with Eddie South's orchestra.

In January 1929, Jackson returned to London, recording one song with Metropole Records and four unissued songs with Duophone. Returning to Paris on January 26, she performed at the opening of Ada "Bricktop" Smith's latest nightclub. Shortly afterwards, Jackson purchased an apartment on the Rue Chalgrin, a small right-angle street in the Chaillot district, where she held cocktail parties before taking her guests to the Bal Negre cabaret to dance the Biguine. On April 6, Jackson converted her apartment into a small cabaret, Chez Zaïdée, imitating Josephine Baker's own French nitery. Chez Zaïdée did not last long. During the spring, she was invited to sing at Countee Cullen's small house party near the rue Pigalle and at Black dancer Louis Cole's birthday party at his apartment near the Trocadero.

Throughout the summer of 1929, Jackson performed regularly at the Boeuf Sur Le Toits, Chez Florence and Floresco's before she was admitted to hospital on July 27 with a sprained ankle. In between these engagements, she frequently flew back to London for radio appearances. She often traveled on Guy Robson's private plane.

In November 1929, Jackson returned to Britain for an eight-month provincial tour organized by her manager, E.J. Bonner, appearing in Manchester, Birkenhead, Bristol, Glasgow, Blackpool, Sheffield and Dublin.

Between January and April 1930, she recorded six more songs with Parlophone.

In June 1930, towards the end of the tour, Foresythe returned to Europe and accompanied Jackson once again. On June 13, Jackson was back in Paris, with a four-month contract with Russian-themed Sheherazade Cabaret. From June to August 1930 she was in London to record six songs with British Parlophone.

That autumn, Jackson started a three-month German tour. In November she was appearing at Berlin's Kabarett der Komiker. The German press gave mixed reviews for her singing, which most German audiences felt was barely audible in their large concert halls.

In January 1931, she returned to Paris for a month-long engagement at the L'Ange Bleu Bar. The following month, she continued her European tour, appearing in Budapest at the Royal Hotel, accompanied by Russian pianist Suponitzkaya. Her performance were broadcast nightly on Hungarian radio stations.

Returning to Paris in June, at the height of the Paris Colonial Exposition, she appeared in a new cabaret, La Jungle-Montmartre, accompanied by Foresythe; he eventually left for another band.

After the Exposition closed in November, she moved over to Le Miami Club (quitting after they failed to pay her) and later the New Marine Club. That winter, George White offered her some of the music scores from his Broadway production, Scandals of 1931, probably with the intention of her joining the show or for a recording session that never materialised.

During January–April 1932, Jackson was based at Cannes, opening a nightclub, Sous le Maquis, hoping to have Josephine Baker as her headliner. The club was briefly successful, but she decided to return to Paris.

In May, she began a six-month residency at Le Bosphore (another Russian cabaret) and Chez Zelli's (an American-themed nightclub). In July, she also began performing at the Sheherazade cabaret as well, singing and dancing for her friends, Pizella, Maurice Chevalier and Prince Yusupov. In August she went to the resort town of St. Jean de Luz for a month's engagement at the Maxim Bar. The following month, while performing a "Russian Act" at the Sheherazade, she planned a trip to Moscow, which did not take place.

In December, she returned to London, with a major role in William Walker's Ballyhoo Revue, which opened on December 22 at the Comedy Theatre. The cast included Hermione Baddeley, Walter Crisham, Phyllis Clare, Pearl Argyle and Leon Morton.

The two-act revue was devised and staged by William Walker and Robert Nesbitt. Dances and ballets were staged by Buddy Bradley and Frederick Ashton. Jackson made her initial appearance in Act 1 in the fourth sketch, "Black Magic", performing a gloomy blues number. She returned again in sketch 12, "Mediterranean Madness", performing a much more lively number. She made her final appearance in Act 2 in the slow melancholic sketch, "I've Got The Wrong Man".

The British press was critical of the revue; although the dance and ballet number were considered stellar, the singing of Phyllis Clare wasn't received well and Jackson's voice wasn't considered "Harlem" enough for the show. Often her voice was drowned out by the chorus girls.

On March 17, 1933, Jackson returned to her regular appearances on BBC Radio. She also began doubling at the Blue Train nightclub. In the meantime, film director Andrew Buchanan took her on screen, where she appeared in two short films with the Ideal Cine-Magazine, I've Got the Wrong Man and Black Magic. She recorded several numbers from the show with Decca Records, such as the comedy number "Pink Elephants", "I’ve Got the Wrong Man" and "Black Magic". Jackson left the show to return to Paris to perform at the Robinson nightclub.

In June, she starred in Joe Zelli's new cabaret, Chez Les Nudistes, appearing semi-nude in an extravagant revue, Au Dela... des Reins, for the next four months. She also doubled at the Sheherazade, Le Grand Ecart and Le Bosphore cabarets. In September 1933, she took a month off to appear in Saint Jean-de-Luz at the Auberge Club.

The French Riviera, Monaco & Switzerland (1934–1935)

Besides her occasional appearances in Paris at the Hotel Ritz, Sheherazade and Le Bosphore cabarets, Jackson toured the French Riviera, appearing in Juan-les-Pins, Évian-les-Bains, Cannes and Monte Carlo.

In February 1935, Jackson moved to Switzerland, where she appeared for ten months with Benny Peyton's Jazz Kings orchestra. They appeared in Zurich, Ouchy, Lausanne, Berne, Neuchatel and Geneva. In between engagements, Jackson returned to France for appearances in Saint Jean-de-Luz and Paris at Fred Payne's Bar.

Romania (1936–1939)

In February 1936, as the annual Rallye Monte Carlo came to a close, Jackson was introduced to one of the racers, 32-year old Barbu Neamțu, a wealthy Romanian mechanical engineer who was a sportsman and Ford representative.

Barbu was born c.1904 in Craiova, a city of 100,000 located in the midst of the rich agricultural territory of Southwestern Romania. He was the eldest of six children of Eugenia Albeanu and Constantin Neamtu. Besides being a wealthy landowner, 69-year old Constantin Neamtu had an expensive Romanian and Belgian education and was a professor, the director of the Romanian National Bank (Craiova Branch), director of Craiova's Commerce Bank and a local politician.

From 1927-1930, Barbu had traveled to England, studying English and Engineering while attending Cambridge University. While he was away, his father presented him with a position as a deputy of the city of Craiova. On January 16, 1932, he became the director of a Ford-Romania truck and tractor repair and maintenance warehouse. As early as September 1933, Barbu also took up speed racing as a hobby, winning numerous trophies.

Barbu was already in an unhappy marriage, from which he had a daughter. Nevertheless, upon his return to Craiova in February 1936 from the Rallye Monte Carlo, he brought with him his new Black mistress. This caused an immediate scandal across Craiova, especially as, according to the locals, Jackson was the first Black woman they had ever seen . Local children followed her around town, attempting to rub the "Blackness" from her skin. While Barbu began divorce proceedings with his current wife, Jackson was relocated to Bucharest, staying at 7, Dacia Boulevard.

From 1936-1937, Jackson maintained a residency at Bucharest's Restaurant-Bar Zissu, a Parisian-themed cabaret at 5 Strada Serban Voda. She danced and performed in English, French and soon began including Romanian songs as well. At some point during this period she went on a short Egyptian tour.

On October 27, 1937, Jackson boarded the SS Queen Mary from Cherbourg back to New York. Landing on November 1 (a decade since her departure), she moved into the Dewey Square Hotel on Seventh Avenue and began a ten-month nightclub engagement in New York and Philadelphia. Upon arrival, she was met by American journalists, such as those of the Pittsburgh Courier: "Zaidee Williams Jackson was singing sweet songs at Chez Florence in Montmartre when we met her. A slim bronze young woman, who had Paris by its ears. We wonder if anyone who has lived over there for ten years as she has can come back here to prejudice and hate and pick up where she left off. We don't doubt that she'll return to Europe where, she says 'her work is more appreciated... and more lucrative'."

In March 1938, Barbu traveled to New York and moved into the Dewey Hotel with Jackson.

On September 27, Jackson received her new passport and registered at Craiova's police station.

The marriage was troubled by jealousy and the racism of her husband's family who felt that Barbu had married beneath himself. He was accused of renouncing his family for a Negro. Jackson, the 41-year-old (although she claimed to be four years younger) Black cabaret star who could hardly speak Romanian and performed naked in Paris wasn't considered an equal to the 34-year-old well-educated and privileged Barbu. To make matters worse, the Romanian government made it difficult for Jackson to renew her work visa, demanding that she had to be an "Ethnic Romanian".

In November, she returned to Paris, appearing at Jimmy Monroe's Swing Club. The following month she appeared in the revue, "Harlem au Coliseum" at the Paris-Coliseum, alongside Myrtle Watkins and the Three Dukes with music provided by Willie Lewis' Orchestra.

In early 1939, despite warnings from the American Embassy of impending war, Jackson remained in Paris, performing at Fred Payne's Bar. However, in February, she had returned home to Craiova, registering with the National Liberal Party, with which her husband's family was involved.

Throughout the spring of 1939, she appeared regularly on Radio-Bucharest, performing popular American songs she had learned during her 1938 trip to the States. These were halcyon days for the newlyweds. Barbu was frequently away at his office in Craiova, leaving Jackson in their new home. She also returned to her place as the star of the Restaurant Zissu, alongside Jean Moscopol. Occasionally she appeared at the Maxim Zig-Zag Cabaret at 5 Strada Otelelisianu.

World War II (1940–1945)

On January 16, 1940, Jackson along with various other Romanian entertainers, appeared in a Jazz concert at the Romanian Athenaeum. The concert was an immense success and increased her popularity among Romanian audiences.

Despite the war, Jackson was able to continue working and on April 7 she and the singer Maria Tănase headlined in a revue onstage at the Savoy Hall of the Cărăbuş Theater alongside the Revistă Mariana company.

Two months later, in July 1940, King Carol handed over Bessarabia and northern Bukovina to the Soviet Union. Two months later, in September 1940, the king was forced into exile and General Ion Antonescu seized power for the next four years. Romania soon announced its new alliance with Nazi Germany. On October 8, German troops began crossing into Romania and soon numbered over 500,000. Although Jackson herself encountered no real trouble, she found it expedient to stay away from certain public places. The American Ford company immediately severed ties with Romania, and Barbu's SEBAR company began repairing military-grade vehicles for the Germans.

From 1940-1944, Jackson's life was hardly interrupted by the constant changes Europe was going through. As a Romanian citizen, in a country safe from Nazi invasion (as long as they upheld their alliance), her career was basically unaffected.

In 1943, Romania became a regular target of Allied aerial bombardment, such as the attack on the oil fields of Ploiești on August 1, 1943. In October 1943, a frustrated Barbu was forced to close his factory temporarily after a worker's strike.

By 1944, Bucharest was subjected to intense bombing on April 4 and 15, 1944, and the Luftwaffe bombed the city on August 24 and 25 after the country switched sides. Theatres, cabarets and cinemas were shut down, if they weren't damaged by the bombs. Jackson relocated to the village of Olari, two hundred miles away from the destruction.

On August 30, 1944, Soviet troops occupied Romania. Bucharest was heavily militarized, the streets filled with soldiers, many of them looting abandoned homes. In 1945, SEBAR was reopened, this time to manufacture vehicles for the Soviet Union. In Bucharest, the entertainment was revived as many establishments reopened. Jackson resumed performing.

Communist Romania (1946–1956)

From 1945-1947 Jackson appeared at the Restaurant Zissu. Initially she was unable to seek work as she was refused a work permit. After six months without work, the government issued her permit. She was only allowed a meager worker's salary of 600 leis a month. After much protest, she was finally upgraded to an artist's salary of 1,500 leis a month. Nightly taxi cabs to and from her jobs cost 30 leis daily, which meant spending two-thirds of her salary for transportation. Often she chose to walk two miles in the dead of night from her apartment to save money to eat since meals were no longer supplied to artists.

In 1946, the Soviet government shut down SEBAR and Barbu remained in Bucharest permanently with his wife. Although engineers were in great demand, he however could get very little work as one had to be approved by the State. On August 5, 1946 during a trip to Craiova, Jackson's purse with 1.6 million Lei was stolen.

On December 30, 1947, the old monarchy was abolished and Romania became an republic. The director of the Zissu closed down the establishment and fled to Bulgaria. Jackson found employment at the Circ Bucharest, appearing in a revue, including a scene where she entered the stage riding on the back of a camel before performing a number.

Due to the heavy censorship of Western music and culture, Jackson remained popular amongst Romanian audiences, even with the youth, who saw her as Romania's own Ella Fitzgerald, Billie Holiday or Josephine Baker. Despite her popularity, Jackson encountered prejudice and discrimination from musicians and managers.

The year 1948, after the Romanian Communist Party came to power, is when all of her troubles began. That June, all businesses and establishments became nationalized by the government. Despite being an entertainer, she was still considered an employee of the state. This caused the American Embassy to declare her passport void, making any possibilities of visiting the United States impossible. Six months later, during Christmas, the Securitate (secret police) raided the Neamtu estate in Olari and declared it property of the state. Jackson's in-laws were left outside in the snow, surrounded by their belongings.

Later, during the summer of 1949, she began corresponding with her old friend, Lawrence Brown, who was touring the Soviet Union with Paul Robeson at the time. She described the new way of life under the new government and her growing fears of her uncertain future in Romania.

On April 14, 1951, Barbu and the majority of the Neamtu family were declared "Bourgeois spies" and sent to Ghencea Penitentiary (a local Bucharest prison) for 18 months. Jackson was unable to write to or visit her husband. Eight days later, she appeared in a variety concert at the Savoy Hall of the old Cărăbuș Theatre.

Later in September 1952, the Neamtu family was divided up and sent to various camps such as Popești Leordeni Camp, Pipera Farm, Dumbrăveni Penitentiary, Jilava Penitentiary, Peninsula Camp and Aiud Penitentiary where they were ill-fed and worked hard. There was never a charge or a trial. After four years they were released, broken and impoverished.

Jackson petitioned the American Embassy to issue a new passport to her. Initially, the Embassy was sympathetic but later became uncooperative due to the antagonism of a Hungarian woman secretary. Meanwhile, her sister, Corinna Williams-Thomas, was working on her behalf, although writing to President Truman produced no results. Jackson wrote to Paul Robeson and William Patterson, who were both known to be close with the Communists. Neither replied.

Once Barbu was released in early 1955, he received a job in the provinces and asked Jackson to go with him. She chose to remain in Bucharest, suggesting that they divorce. While in the process of divorcing, in April 1955, her sister wrote to President Eisenhower who promised prompt action. After the divorce was finalised, Jackson departed for a tour of Romania's major cities.

Later career

In January 1956, as the result of an appeal filed by the American Civil Liberties Union with the board of Immigration Appeals, the US State Department permitted Jackson to return to the United States. From Bucharest she flew to Amsterdam and changed planes directly for New York, where she was greeted with an American passport. She missed the Red Scare movement, although there was still heavy prejudice against Communists and those who had lived for several years in a Communist country. Jackson resumed her career on the American stage until 1959. During the summer of 1967, she gave a brief interview in Harlem to Frank Driggs.

Zaidee Jackson died on December 15, 1970, near her sister's family in Connecticut.

References

External links
 https://www.newspapers.com/newspage/40132322/
 http://www.worldcat.org/title/zaidee-jackson-interview/oclc/56098170
 http://gallica.bnf.fr/
 https://www.imdb.com/name/nm2957662/?ref_=tt_cl_t6

1897 births
1970 deaths
20th-century American actresses
20th-century Romanian actresses
20th-century French actresses
American film actresses
American burlesque performers
Cabaret singers
French vedettes
Actresses from Boston
Naturalised citizens of Romania
African-American actresses
African-American female dancers
American female dancers
American female erotic dancers
20th-century African-American women singers
Music hall performers
Harlem Renaissance
Traditional pop music singers
Vaudeville performers
American emigrants to France
American emigrants to Romania
20th-century American singers
People from Augusta, Georgia
20th-century American women singers
20th-century American dancers